Drovniki is a rural locality (a village) in Seletskoye Rural Settlement, Suzdalsky District, Vladimir Oblast, Russia. The population was 2 as of 2010.

Geography 
Drovniki is located 18 km southeast of Suzdal (the district's administrative centre) by road. Pesochnoye is the nearest rural locality.

References 

Rural localities in Suzdalsky District